Alyce Faye Eichelberger Cleese (née McBride; born October 28, 1944) is an American psychotherapist, author and talk radio host.  She was married to golfer Dave Eichelberger and later to actor-comedian John Cleese.

Education
Alyce Faye McBride received her bachelor's degree from Oklahoma State University in 1966. While at Oklahoma State, she served as "queen" of Willard Hall, before it was transformed from a women's dormitory into its current role as the site of the University's College of Education.  She continued her studies at Baylor University, earning master's degrees in Educational Psychology and in Vocational and Educational Counseling.  The future Eichelberger Cleese then moved to London, where she studied the Psychoanalysis of children under Anna Freud, working with disturbed children from disadvantaged backgrounds at The Hampstead Clinic (established by Freud in 1952), and receiving a postgraduate qualification, the Diploma in the Maladjusted Child, from the University of London Institute of Education.

Career
Eichelberger worked as a psychotherapist for more than three decades.  She is the co-author (with Brian Bates) of How to Manage Your Mother: Understanding the Most Difficult, Complicated, and Fascinating Relationship in Your Life and she sits on the Board of Trustees of the Esalen Institute. Alyce Faye Cleese is on the American Board of National Theatre for London and the Board of Shakespeare Society for New York.  She is a visiting senior tutor for Massachusetts General Hospital.

Honors
She was honored by Harvard University for her work in psychotherapy, and was inducted into the Oklahoma State University College of Education Hall of Fame in 2007.

Marriage to John Cleese and divorce
After divorcing Dave Eichelberger (with whom she had two sons), she met actor John Cleese in 1990 and they married in 1992. They divorced in 2008, though details of the divorce settlement only became public knowledge in August 2009. Alyce Cleese was represented by Fiona Shackleton, divorce lawyer for Prince Charles and Paul McCartney.

References

External links
Eichelberger on UCTV as part of the Henry A. Schimberg Endowment in Ethics & Enterprise Lecture Series.

1944 births
20th-century American women scientists
20th-century American women writers
20th-century American psychologists
21st-century American women scientists
21st-century American women writers
21st-century American psychologists
Alumni of the UCL Institute of Education
American expatriates in England
American psychology writers
American psychotherapists
American talk radio hosts
Living people
Oklahoma State University alumni
People from Frederick, Oklahoma
Radio personalities from Oklahoma